Astrodaucus is a genus of flowering plants in the family Apiaceae, with 2 species. It is endemic to southwest Asia, southern Europe and eastern Europe.

References

Apioideae
Apioideae genera